Barilius dimorphicus is a fish in genus Barilius of the family Cyprinidae. It is found in India.

References 

D
Fish described in 1990